Yakassé-Féyassé is a town in eastern Ivory Coast. It is a sub-prefecture of Abengourou Department in Indénié-Djuablin Region, Comoé District.

Yakassé-Féyassé was a commune until March 2012, when it became one of 1126 communes nationwide that were abolished.

In 2014, the population of the sub-prefecture of Yakassé-Féyassé was 36,838.

Villages
The nine villages of the sub-prefecture of Yakassé-Féyassé and their population in 2014 are:
 Yakassé-Feyassé  (7 664)
 Apprompronou  (4 276)
 Eboissué  (1 595)
 Kouamé N'ziankro  (1 893)
 Padiégnan  (3 391)
 Sankadiokro  (9 736)
 Yao Babikro  (1 393)
 Zamaka  (3 566)
 Zinzenou  (3 324)

References

Sub-prefectures of Indénié-Djuablin
Former communes of Ivory Coast